Jak X: Combat Racing (known simply as Jak X in Europe, Africa and Australia) is a 2005 vehicular combat video game developed by Naughty Dog and published by Sony Computer Entertainment for the PlayStation 2 console. It is the fourth installment in the Jak and Daxter series and the final game in the series to be produced by Naughty Dog. The plot follows protagonist Jak and his allies who, after having been poisoned, must partake in a championship of the fictional sport of "combat racing" in an effort to obtain an antidote.

The gameplay differs from previous installments in the series, focusing on arcade racing rather than action-adventure gameplay. However, the driving mechanics of the game were modeled after the previous entry in the series, Jak 3. Furthermore, Combat Racing was the first Jak and Daxter game to feature a multiplayer mode, with the second being Daxter. In 2017, the game was re-released for the PlayStation 4, alongside Jak and Daxter: The Precursor Legacy, Jak II, and Jak 3.

Gameplay
In Combat Racing, the player controls characters from the Jak and Daxter series, all of which race in customizable dune buggy-style vehicles. The two main modes of play in the game are Adventure and Exhibition. Jak, the main character of the series, is the only playable character in the Adventure mode, and must participate in a series of Eco Cup Championships in the game's story to obtain an antidote to a poison he and his comrades have consumed. Jak can also take part in a variety of Events in the Championships as to earn Medal Points and advance through the ranks. The main event of the game is the Circuit Race, in which Jak must finish a set of laps in a course while avoiding the wrath of the other racers. The player can destroy these racers as well by picking up Yellow and Red Eco weapons, with Yellow Eco acting as an offensive weapon made to attack and destroy opponents, and Red Eco acting as a defensive weapon made to protect the player from incoming attacks. Green and Blue Eco can also be picked up, acting as health recovery and turbo respectively. Causing and taking damage causes a Dark Eco meter to fill up which, once full, causes weapons to become more potent versions of themselves. Save data from the first three Jak and Daxter games, Daxter and Ratchet: Deadlocked unlock several drivers for the game, including Ratchet from Ratchet & Clank. For the PlayStation 4 port, the save data of the PS4 ports of the first three Jak and Daxter games, Uncharted: The Nathan Drake Collection and Ratchet & Clank (2016) are required to unlock the content.

Plot
A year after the Dark Maker ship has been destroyed, Haven City has been steadily rebuilt after Errol's defeat, and has grown into a peaceful utopia. Kras City, a dangerous dystopian city full of ruthless mobsters, is also home to a popular sport known as "Combat Racing". Jak, Daxter, Ashelin, Samos, Keira and Torn are invited to the reading of Krew's (one of the villains of Jak II) last will, where they meet Krew's daughter, Rayn. After offering a toast, Krew reveals in a recording that he always wanted to win the Combat Racing Championship and demands that everyone present drive for him, revealing that the wine they toasted with was poisoned with minute doses of a slow acting poison known as Black Shade. Krew gives them an ultimatum: win the next Kras City Championship as his team and receive the antidote when they win, or die. Divided into four cups, Jak and his friends must race and win each round of the race to gain entrance to the championship.

During the gang's racing, Keira acts as their primary mechanic, eventually building faster new vehicles to aid Jak in his races. However, her true wish is to race alongside her friends but Samos forbids it due to the dangerous nature of the competition. Sig also appears to assist the crew, whereas Kleiver appears to challenge Jak with a friendly rivalry. Pecker manages to become a co-announcer working with TV personality and star GT Blitz. He also works as an investigative reporter for the shady goings-on in the syndicated racing event.

The main antagonists are members of a rival crime family to Krew's, led by the mysterious and unidentified boss, Mizo. Mizo's top henchmen, Cutter, Edje, and Shiv are Jak's main competition, but due to their failure to defeat Jak, Mizo's #2, Razer, a famous racer, comes back out of retirement. Finally another competitor enters for Mizo, an ex-Krimzon Guard robot known as UR-86. During the continuing competitions, stories of Blitz's father enter the mix as his father was a legendary racer for the Kras City Grand Championship, while Rayn continues to search through her father's video diaries searching for more information on Mizo and any information that may assist the team in defeating him. Animosity grows between Mizo's racers and Rayn and Jak and the gang as Jak continues to win races making Mizo more and more desperate.
 
As the final race approaches, GT Blitz enters as a mystery racer for Mizo's team. Keira finally jumps into the race as well. Jak completes and wins the Kras City Grand Championship. Blitz angrily storms over to Rayn claiming she cheated before revealing himself to be Mizo. After being subsequently exposed by Pecker, Mizo then steals the antidote and drives off with Jak in pursuit. Jak manages to damage Mizo's car enough that he ends up in a fiery crash. As Jak retrieves the antidote, Mizo mentions his father's "sick" love of racing and how his father's neglect to his family in the name of the sport caused his family to strive to own all of it, to the point that Mizo murdered his father. As Jak walks away, Mizo takes a shot at Jak by noting his habit of "Leaving people to die," referencing when Jak left Krew to die in Jak II and left a deceased Damas behind in Jak 3. Jak responds with "You get used to it," before Mizo's car explodes, killing him.

Jak and the team celebrate with drinks at a bar where Samos acknowledges Keira's good driving indicating that he has accepted that she has grown up. Rayn bids the team farewell, but leaves a figment of Krew's video diary which Daxter activates, presenting a hologram of Krew telling Rayn how to pour the wine to avoid being poisoned and outlining his plan for his family to become the top crime family in the region. This reveals Rayn to be even more rotten and manipulative than her father, and shows that she had been lying to and using the team the whole time. Rayn drives away calling her associates for a crime family meeting, claiming herself as the one in charge. She also tells her associates to spare Jak's team. Regardless, Jak and the team continue to celebrate, and Jak and Keira finally share a kiss at Daxter's encouragement to which he remarks, "Now that's what I call a photo finish!"

Development
Naughty Dog selected Jak X: Combat Racing as their next project whilst three fourths of the way through the development of Jak 3. The company wanted to expand on the vehicle aspects of Jak 3. 

The soundtrack for the game was recorded by musicians from various rock and metal bands, including A Perfect Circle, The Crystal Method, Faith No More and Tool. The game's intro features songs from Queens of the Stone Age's album Songs for the Deaf.

ReceptionJak X: Combat Racing'' received "generally favorable reviews", according to review aggregator Metacritic. GameSpot gave the game 7.9/10 praising the game's graphics and online multiplayer system while criticizing the game's difficulty in certain modes. Eurogamer rated the title 7/10. They were impressed by the game's sensation of speed, the variety provided by the different modes and the online functionality but thought it suffered from the occasional difficulty spike and "loose, floaty handling" of the vehicles. IGN thought that the game was "a nicely presented, well-rounded combat racer" which benefited from a strong storyline and multiple play modes which made it good value. It was given an 8/10 overall score. It was later added to the Sony's Greatest Hits section.

References

External links 
 
 
 

2005 video games
Crossover video games
Jak and Daxter
Naughty Dog games
PlayStation 2 games
PlayStation 2-only games
Sony Interactive Entertainment games
Vehicular combat games
Video games developed in the United States
Video games set on fictional planets
Multiplayer and single-player video games